Captain Lord Edward William John Manners (5 August 1864 - 26 February 1903), was a British army officer and Conservative politician.

Early life
Manners was the eldest son of John Manners, 7th Duke of Rutland, by his second marriage to Janetta Hughan, daughter of Thomas Hughan. Henry Manners, 8th Duke of Rutland, was his half-brother and Lord Cecil Manners his brother.

He received his education at Wellington College and at the Royal Military College, Sandhurst.

Career
He joined the 4th Battalion of the Rifle Brigade (Prince Consort's Own), and was promoted to Captain in the 5th Battalion of the Rifle Brigade on 4 April 1894. At one time, he was a Major in the 3rd Battalion Royal Leicestershire Regiment.

In 1895, he contested the Melton Division against Alderman Wakerley to succeed his half-brother as Member of Parliament for Melton, a seat he held until 1900, when he was forced to retire due to ill-health, and his brother Cecil replaced him.

"Lord Edward was by no means an eloquent speaker, but he was able to give expression to his views very clearly, and impressed his audiences with his genial and unaffected manner... Socially, Lord Edward was exceedingly popular, and during the time he occupied the position of Field Master of the Belvoir Hounds, he was held in great respect. He inherited much of the courtesy of his father, and a large share of the amiability of his mother."

Personal life
He was a member of the Carlton Club (in St James's, London that was the original home of the Conservative Party) and the Turf Club.

After suffering from consumption (known today as tuberculosis) and failing health for considerable time, Manners died at Cannes in February 1903, aged only 38. He never married. After his body was brought from Cannes to London for cremation, his funeral was held in the Mausoleum at Belvoir Castle. The next day, a memorial service was held for him at St Margaret's, Westminster.

References

Links

1864 births
1903 deaths
Younger sons of dukes
E
Conservative Party (UK) MPs for English constituencies
UK MPs 1895–1900